Endel Eero (21 November 1930 in Valjala – 7 September 2006) is an Estonian politician. He was a member of the VII and VIII Riigikogu.

References

1930 births
2006 deaths
Estonian Coalition Party politicians
Members of the Riigikogu, 1992–1995
Tallinn University of Technology alumni
People from Saaremaa Parish
Burials at Metsakalmistu
Members of the Riigikogu, 1995–1999